40th parallel may refer to:

40th parallel north, a circle of latitude in the Northern Hemisphere
40th parallel south, a circle of latitude in the Southern Hemisphere